Harpalus koshiensis is a species of ground beetle in the subfamily Harpalinae. It was described by Kirschenhofer in 1992.

References

koshiensis
Beetles described in 1992